Diana Fowler LeBlanc,  (born 1940 in Toronto) is the widow of former Governor General of Canada, Roméo LeBlanc, during whose term she was a Viceregal consort.

During the 1960s she was in the broadcasting industry, stationed at the Paris offices of Radio-Canada and then the London office of CBC.

Education
 King's Hall, Compton, Quebec (now Bishop's College School)
 1959: University of Paris, French Civilization, diploma
 1996: McGill University, Bachelor of Social Work

Awards and recognition
 1995: Companion of the Order of Canada and  Dame of Justice of the Order of St. John, due to position as Viceregal consort (Governor General's Spouse).
 1998: University of Ottawa, Honorary Doctorate

Arms

External links

See also 
List of Bishop's College School alumni

|-

1940 births
Living people
Companions of the Order of Canada
McGill University School of Social Work alumni
Bishop's College School alumni
People from Toronto
University of Paris alumni
Canadian viceregal consorts